Cauca Department is a Department of Southwestern Colombia. Located in the southwestern part of the country, facing the Pacific Ocean to the west, the Valle del Cauca Department to the north, Tolima Department to the northeast, Huila Department to the east, and Nariño Department to the south. Putumayo and Caqueta Departments border the southeast portion of Cauca Department as well. Its capital is the city of Popayán. The offshore island of Malpelo belongs to the department. It is located in the southwest of the country, mainly in the Andean and Pacific regions (between 0°58′54″N and 3°19′04″N latitude, 75°47′36″W and 77°57′05″W longitude) plus a tiny part (Piamonte) in the Amazonian region. The area includes 2.56% of the country.

Administrative Division

Cauca department is divided into 42 municipalities, 99 districts, 474 police posts and numerous villages and populated places. The municipalities are grouped into 27 circles and 29 notaries: a circle-based registration in Popayán and eight sectional offices based in Bolívar, Caloto, Puerto Tejada, Santander de Quilichao, Patia, Guapi and Silvia, makes up the judicial district of Popayán. This district possesses 8 judicial circuit seats in Popayán, Bolívar, Caloto, Guapi, Patia, Puerto Tejada, Santander de Quilichao and Silvia. The department makes up the constituency of Cauca.

It has many small towns and indigenous reservations such as the Lopez Adentro reservation.

Physiography
The relief of the territory of the department of Cauca belongs to the Andean system at the macro level seven distinguishing morphological units:
 the Pacific Plate
 the Western Cordillera
 the Central Cordillera
 the highlands of Popayán
 the Macizo Colombiano
 Valle del Patia
 a small sliver of the Amazon Basin

The Pacific Plate comprises two sectors, firstly the alluvial coastal belt or platform characterized by low, swampy, mangrove forest with many rivers estuaries subject to the ebb and flow of tides, the remainder is a plain or hills comprising the western slopes of the western cordillera.

The western cordillera in Cauca extends from southwest to northeast. Among the most important landmarks are the blade of Napí, the hills of Guaduas, Munchique, and Naya, and the Cauca River Valley. The central mountain range crosses the department from south to north; relevant landmarks include Sotará Colcano, Petacas Nevado del Huila, and the departmental boundary.

The highlands of Popayán, sandwiched between the Western and Central Cordilleras, is seen as a landmark within the plateau of the hill of La Tetilla. Among the most representative landmarks of the Colombian Massif, shared with the department of Huila, are the Páramo del Buey, the volcanoes of Cutanga and Puracé, the peak of Paletará, and the Sierra Nevada of Coconucos. Patia Valley, where the Patia River runs north-south and framed by the Central and Western mountain ranges, extends into Nariño Department. The Amazonian salient corresponds to the so-called Bota Caucana, through which flows the Japurá River.

Colombian Massif
The Colombian Massif, also called the Nudo de Almaguer, is a mountainous area of "Andes colombianos" covering the departments of Cauca, Huila, and Nariño. In the south is the Nudo de los Pastos, and the north, central, and eastern mountain ranges emerge. The Colombian Massif is a strategic national and international level, given its significance for water production, biodiversity and ecosystems, an area that represents a special conformation of the regions with more potential for development in Colombia.

Hydrography
Cauca Department can be divided into the following hydrographic regions:
 The Cauca river system, consisting of five major basins: Alto Cauca, Pacific, Alto Magdalena, Patia and Caqueta. Alto Cauca, the most important, is formed by the Cauca River and its tributaries: Palo, Guengué, Negro, Teta, Desbaratado, and Quilichao, Mondomo, Ovejas, Pescador, Robles, Piedras, Sucio, Palacé, Cofre, Honda, Cajibío, Piendamó, Tunia, Molino, Timbío and Blanco.
Patia basin, consists of the Patia River and its tributary rivers Guachinoco, Ismita, Bojoleo, El Guaba, Sambingo and Mayo.
Outside the Patia basin, the Pacific slope is mainly drained by the rivers Guapi, Timbiquí, Saija and Micay.
Alto Magdalena, whose main river is the Páez River which is fed by the rivers: San Vicente, Moras, Ullucos, Negro y Negro de Narvaez, and the streams: Toez, Símbola, Salado, Gualcar, Gallo, Macana, Honda and Totumo.
Caquetá basin, consists of the Caquetá River into which the rivers Cusiyaco, Cascabelito, Verdeyaco, Mandiyaco, Fragua, Cascabel, Curiaco and Pacayaco flow.

Gorgonilla and Gorgona islands are located in the Pacific Ocean and belong to Cauca Department.

Economy

The Cauca economy is based primarily on agriculture and livestock production, forestry, fishing and trade. Agriculture has been developed and modernized in the northern department, with the main crops being sugar cane, cane panela, conventional maize, rice, corn tech, banana, agave, yucca, potatoes, coconut, sorghum, cocoa, groundnut, and palm.

In the Pacific region is extracted gold, silver and platinum. Other non-precious minerals that are exploited are sulfur, asbestos, limestone, talc, gypsum and coal. The manufacturing industry is located in Popayán, Santander de Quilichao, Puerto Tejada with factories of food, beverages, dairy products, paper, packaging, wood processing, sugar industry and paper processing for export. The main centers of commercial activity are Popayán, Santander de Quilichao, Patia, Puerto Tejada, Piendamó and Corinto.

Municipalities

Almaguer
Argelia
Balboa
Bolívar
Buenos Aires
Cajibío
Caldono
Caloto
Corinto
El Tambo
Florencia
Guapi
Inzá
Jambaló
La Sierra
La Vega
López de Micay
Mercaderes
Miranda
Morales
Padilla
Páez
Patía
Piamonte
Piendamó
Popayán
Puerto Tejada
Puracé
Rosas
San Sebastián
Santander de Quilichao
Santa Rosa
Silvia
Sotará
Suárez
Sucre
Timbío
Timbiquí
Toribío
Totoró
Villa Rica

References

External links

Territorial-Environmental Information System of Colombian Amazon SIAT-AC website 

 
Departments of Colombia
States and territories established in 1857
1857 establishments in the Republic of New Granada